The 1997 UEFA Intertoto Cup finals were won by three French teams -- Lyon, Bastia, and Auxerre. All three teams advanced to the UEFA Cup.

Qualified teams

Group stage

Group 1

Group 2

Group 3

Group 4

Group 5

Group 6

Group 7

Group 8

Group 9

Group 10

Group 11

Group 12

Semi-finals

First leg

Second leg

4–4 on aggregate, Auxerre won on away goals rule.

Halmstad won 1–0 on aggregate.

Duisburg won 5–3 on aggregate.

Bastia won 2–1 on aggregate.

Lyon won 3–2 on aggregate.

2–2 on aggregate, Montpellier won on away goals rule.

Finals

First leg

Second leg

Bastia won 2–1 on aggregate.

Lyon won 4–2 on aggregate.

Auxerre won 2–0 on aggregate.

See also
1997–98 UEFA Champions League
1997–98 UEFA Cup Winners' Cup
1997–98 UEFA Cup

References

External links
Official site
Results at RSSSF

UEFA Intertoto Cup
4